Shadow Fight 2 is a role-playing fighting game published and developed by Nekki and Banzai Games. It is the second installment in the Shadow Fight series and was soft-launched on October 22, 2013. The full game was released worldwide on May 1, 2014, for both the Android and iOS operating systems. It was then released to Windows 8 and 8.1 on January 26, 2015, and to the Nintendo Switch as a downloadable Nintendo eShop title on September 13, 2018.

The game uses the same graphics as Shadow Fight, which depict the player character and their opponents as 2D silhouettes. The player starts out unarmed, but as they level up, they unlock more advanced weapons and equipment. The game is more story-driven than its predecessor and follows a warrior known only as "Shadow", who fights to regain his lost honor and physical body after accidentally opening the Gates of Shadow and unleashing six demons into his world, who reduced him to a faceless silhouette. The title also features a multiplayer mode, which sees players working together to fight powerful bosses in the Underworld.

Shadow Fight 2 received a large number of positive reviews upon release and is regarded as one of the best fighting games for mobile devices.

Gameplay 

Shadow Fight 2 is a 2D fighting game in which players must win the best of three matches against computer-controlled opponents. The game also has RPG elements that let players upgrade their armor, weapons, skills and magical abilities. The game's characters are entirely silhouettes, but the animations are realistic and physics-based.

The player earns gold throughout the game that can be used to buy weapons. The game contains seven different provinces, each with a main boss. The player can enter only five fights before their energy must be replenished, which is done by waiting, paying real money, or watching a limited number of ads. These games may come to a series end after which the full game is completed.

Achievements are a core part of Shadow Fight 2. Players are rewarded for completing the story as well as certain tasks.

Plot 
The world of Shadow Fight 2 takes heavy inspiration from classic Far East culture, primarily China and Japan. Every time the player enters the game, they are presented with an animated cutscene that explains the backstory of the protagonist, "Shadow", who also serves as the narrator. Shadow explains that he was once a legendary warrior,  renowned for never losing a battle. While seeking a worthy opponent, he accidentally opened the Gates of Shadows, a pathway to another realm, unleashing six powerful demons into his world. The demons destroyed Shadow's physical body, reducing him to a faceless silhouette, and went on to bring mayhem and destruction into the world. Now, Shadow feels obligated to defeat the demons. To seal back the Gates, he must retrieve the ancient Seals they are guarding and use them and atone for his mistake.

The game is structured into multiple chapters, or "acts", each revolving around one of the demons Shadow must face: 

 Lynx, the leader of an assassin group called The Order. (Hero Reborn)
 Hermit, a powerful wizard and warrior who opened his own school. (Secret Path)
 Butcher, the leader of a juvenile gang. (Trail of Blood)
 Wasp, the leader of a pirate crew and self-proclaimed "Pirate Queen". (Pirate Throne)
 Widow, who can seduce virtually any man with her charms. (The Greatest Temptation)
 Shogun, a disgraced rōnin-turned-warlord. (Iron Reign)
 Titan, Conqueror of The World. Last boss of the game. (Revelation)

Throughout his journey, Shadow grows more powerful by taking part in various battles and regularly upgrading his equipment to stand a better chance against the demons. He is accompanied by several allies who offer him support and advice, including his old Sensei, a blacksmith named May, and later a conman named Sly. Eventually, Shadow succeeds in defeating all the demons and taking their Seals, before returning to the Gates of Shadow to permanently seal them. The six demons band together to try and stop him, but Shadow overpowers them and closes the Gates. However, before they are fully closed, Titan, the ruler of the Shadow World, emerges from the other side and kidnaps May. This initiates the 'Interlude', wherein Shadow must defeat each demon once again to destroy their Seals and temporarily reopen the Gates. He succeeds and ventures into the Shadow Realm on his own.

Immediately upon arrival, Shadow is attacked by Shroud, a servant of Titan. Weakened by his travel through the Gates, Shadow is almost killed, but Kali, a member of an underground resistance that opposes Titan's reign, rescues him and takes him back to the resistance's hideout. There, the resistance's leader, Cypher, informs Shadow that Titan is, in fact, an alien warlord who has conquered many worlds, including this one, and is planning to invade Shadow's world as well. The resistance is made up of numerous aliens whose worlds were conquered by Titan, and Shadow proceeds to earn their respect by defeating them all in combat. Cypher also fights Shadow and, impressed by his skills, remarks that Shadow might be the warrior prophesied to defeat Titan. He then has Kali take him to meet the Ancient, a powerful being who has trained many warriors (including Shroud) and whose kind was exterminated by Titan. To find the Ancient, Shadow must first locate and defeat Cronos, a robot created by Cypher for this purpose, which eventually turned rogue. Using Cronos's tracking technology, Shadow and Kali find the Ancient, who is initially reluctant to help, but eventually comes to believe in Shadow's powers after he passes all his tests, consisting of fights against the spirits of fallen warriors and Ancient himself.

The Ancient disguises Shadow as one of Titan's soldiers and suggests that he get close to Titan by participating in a tournament held to determine the newest member of Titan's elite forces. Halfway through the tournament, Shadow is called back to the resistance hideout, which has been attacked by Titans' soldiers. He defeats Shroud and is confronted by another warrior, Justice, revealed to be a brainwashed May. After May is captured by the resistance, Shadow and Kali head to Titan's Citadel, where Shadow defeats Titan's bodyguards, all of whom are dark alternate versions of himself. Meanwhile, Ancient leaves the Shadow World to "fight a war" elsewhere. May escapes and arrives to kill Shadow, but he defeats and frees her from Titan's control. While Kali takes May back to the Gates of Shadows, Shadow and Titan engage in a final battle. Once Titan is defeated, his body explodes, destroying the citadel. Shadow is caught in the explosion, but survives and manages to return to the Gates before they are destroyed, regaining his physical body in the process. Shadow is reunited with May, and the two embrace before walking away, unaware that they are being followed by a shadow that has survived the Gates' destruction.

Old Wounds 
Old Wounds is a bonus storyline exclusive to the Special Edition of the game that explores Sensei's backstory, including his encounters with younger versions of the six demons. The battles featured in this mode cannot be replayed.

One day, Sensei runs into the Prince of Ivory City, who is being pursued by Lynx. After Sensei chases Lynx away, the Prince explains that he was kidnapped from his palace by unknown assailants, but managed to escape. When he was kidnapped, the Prince overheard that his soldiers are undergoing training from Hermit, so he and Sensei go to confront him, convinced that he was involved in the Prince's men's betrayal. Hermit reveals that he is the one who hired Lynx to kill the Prince, but claims he only did so for his school's future, and attacks Sensei. After being defeated, Hermit reveals that the Prince's right-hand man, Shogun, ordered him to train his soldiers in exchange for protection from Butcher's gang. Hermit suspects are that Butcher's men are behind the Prince's kidnapping, so he and Sensei go to confront him. Butcher confirms that he kidnapped the Prince, but also reveals that the latter was aware of this all along and that the Prince had paid him to let him go and to tell him where to find a magical Sphere. Exposed, the Prince flees, leaving Sensei to fight Butcher. After his defeat, Butcher points Sensei to the docks where the Sphere is about to be brought in by boat. 

At the docks, Sensei is confronted by Wasp, who reveals that the Sphere was retrieved by someone the day prior and attacks him. After being defeated, Wasp tells Sensei that the mastermind behind all recent events is Widow, who seeks revenge against the Prince for rejecting her love, and has enchanted the Sphere so that anyone who tries to use its power will become her slave. Sensei finds and defeats Widow before persuading her to tell him where the Sphere is. Widow reveals that the Prince took it and used its power to defeat Shogun, whom he now plans to execute for treason. Sensei arrives in Ivory City, where the Prince, driven mad by power, orders a mind-controlled Shogun to kill him. Following Shogun's defeat, the Prince fights Sensei himself but is also defeated. The Ancient then arrives and explains to a confused Sensei that he has temporarily stopped the flow of time to take the Sphere back to where it belongs, and that its presence here was caused by the Gates of Shadows' instability. Before leaving, he ensures Sensei that no one, including him, will remember anything from these events by tomorrow.

Soundtrack

The Game's soundtrack was composed by the Russian Music Composer Lind Erebros. He is also known for his works in Nekki's game series Vector. The soundtrack has received great appreciation from different parts of the world.

Reception 

Jason Parker of CNET rated the game an 8.3/10, calling it one of the best fighting games in the App Store "If you can live with the in-your-face freemium model."

Rob Rich of Gamezebo rated the game 3.5/5 stars, praising the animations and weapon variety while criticizing the "imprecise controls" and some combat mechanics.

Silviu Stahie of Softpedia called the game "probably the best fighting game for Android" and said that it was "easy to learn and master."

Special Edition
Special Edition is the paid version of Shadow Fight 2. It was released on August 17, 2017, on Android and on August 22, 2017, on iOS. This version rewards players with gems more frequently and features an exclusive storyline called Old Wounds. The Nintendo Switch version of Shadow Fight 2, released in 2018, contains the same content as the Special Edition, as well as an exclusive local two-player fighting mode.

Sequel 
A sequel, Shadow Fight 3, was released worldwide on November 16, 2017. Unlike its predecessors, it does not have any flat 2D black shadows to represent the fighters. Instead, they are rendered as three-dimensional characters in an animated 3D environment. The shadows still exist and can be accessed with a new mode known as Shadow Form. While in this form, the fighters can become a shadow and are able to perform physics-defying moves based on the fighters' equipped item's shadow abilities.

References 

2014 video games
IOS games
Android (operating system) games
Windows games
Fighting games
Free-to-play video games
Video games about demons
Video games about ninja
Video games developed in Russia